"Better Way" is a song by singer-songwriter Ben Harper. It is the first track on disc two of his 2006 album Both Sides of the Gun, and was released as the album's first single. A live version of the song appears on Songs for Tibet: The Art of Peace, a compilation album by various artists supporting Tibet. The song also served as a campaign song for Barack Obama during his 2008 presidential campaign.

Themes
A few music journalists have compared the song to John Lennon's "Give Peace a Chance". Noting the songs are similar because they both express anger at current problems, but do not address how these problems were created or how they will be solved.

References

Ben Harper songs
2006 singles
2006 songs
Virgin Records singles
Songs written by Ben Harper